Borojevići may refer to:

 Borojevići, Croatia, a village near Donji Kukuruzari
 Borojevići, Bosnia and Herzegovina, a village near Stolac

See also
 Borojević